Ernest Alfred Vernon (3 September 1895 – 31 January 1949) was an Australian rules footballer who played with St Kilda in the Victorian Football League (VFL).

Notes

External links 

1895 births
1949 deaths
Australian rules footballers from Victoria (Australia)
St Kilda Football Club players